Karkom is a community settlement in northern Israel. Located  in the Korazim Plateau, near the Jordan River, east of Hatzor HaGlilit and just north of the Sea of Galilee, it falls under the jurisdiction of Mevo'ot HaHermon Regional Council.

History
The community was founded in 1986 by residents of nearby moshavim. 160 families live in Karkom. The community is named after an old settlement in antiquity in the area that was also called "Karkom."

References

External links
Village website

Community settlements
Populated places in Northern District (Israel)
Populated places established in 1986
1986 establishments in Israel